Raoul Diagne (10 November 1910 – 12 November 2002) was a French footballer who played defender professionally in France and for the France national football team. He worked as a coach after his playing career.

Born in Saint-Laurent-du-Maroni in French Guiana, Diagne, son of politician Blaise Diagne, was raised in Paris. The young Diagne was a brilliant student, but his passion for football was much stronger than that for studying, despite pressure from his father. Initially cut by French professional football team Stade Français, Raoul Diagne signed at the age of 16 with Racing Club de Paris. A tall, elegant, and versatile defender who was excellent in the air, Diagne was the first black player to be selected for the France national football team. He earned 18 caps with the national team. The French press nicknamed Diagne the "Black Spider", given his impressive height (1.87 m) and limb reach. Playing in Paris, Diagne was close to the star Josephine Baker, who affectionately called him "my little brother." He was a prominent figure in the "black Paris" of the time, alongside boxer Panama Al Brown.  

Diagne could play any position on the field, goalkeeper included. Despite his imposing size and his primary role as a defender, his preferred position was as a right wing. It was as a very offensive-minded right back defender that he made his career on the France team.  In fact, it was not uncommon to see Raoul exchange his position with the actual right winger in order to seek a result at the end of the game. 

At the end of the 1940s, after finishing his playing career in Toulouse (until 1942), Annecy (1942-1945) and Nice (1945-1947), he obtained his coaching diplomas and practiced in Belgium, Algeria, and Normandy. Of Senegalese descent, in the early 1960s Diagne became the first coach of the Senegal national football team.

Raoul Diagne died on 12 November 2002 in Créteil, a southeastern suburb of the Paris metropolitan area. The "Black Spider" was 92 years old and France football mourned the loss of a star and pioneer.

Titles
As a player
French championship in 1936 with RC Paris
Coupe de France 1936, 1939, 1940 with RC Paris

Footnotes

References
 Profile
 An article by Juliet Jacques on the Diagne family and the footballing relationship between France and Senegal In bed with Maradona » Diagne and the racial politics of Les Bleus

1910 births
2002 deaths
French people of French Guianan descent
French sportspeople of Senegalese descent
French footballers
France international footballers
Association football defenders
Racing Club de France Football players
Ligue 1 players
French football managers
Senegal national football team managers
1938 FIFA World Cup players
FC Annecy players
People from Saint-Laurent-du-Maroni
Black French sportspeople